The 2017 Apia International Sydney was a joint 2017 ATP World Tour and 2017 WTA Tour tennis tournament, played on outdoor hard courts in Sydney, New South Wales (NSW). It was the 124th edition of the tournament and took place at the NSW Tennis Centre in Sydney, Australia. It was held from 8 January through 14 January 2017 as part of the Australian Open Series in preparation for the first Grand Slam of the year.

Svetlana Kuznetsova was the defending champion, but lost in the second round to Anastasia Pavlyuchenkova.

Johanna Konta won the title, defeating Agnieszka Radwańska in the final, 6–4, 6–2.

Seeds
The top two seeds received a bye into the second round.

Draw

Finals

Top half

Bottom half

Qualifying

Seeds

Qualifiers

Lucky losers

Draw

First qualifier

Second qualifier

Third qualifier

Fourth qualifier

See also
 2017 Australian Open Series

References
 Main Draw
 Qualifying Draw

Women's Singles